Vollrausch is a criminal provision (Section 323a of the German Criminal Code) which complements Actio libera in causa in German criminal law.

If a person who voluntarily and deliberately gets drunk but he or she did not intend to commit a crime before drinking but he or she satisfied the actus reus of another criminal offence, he or she might be criminally liable for the offence of 'Vollrausch'.

References

German criminal law